The Art of War is an ancient Chinese military treatise dating from the Late Spring and Autumn Period (roughly 5th century BC). The work, which is attributed to the ancient Chinese military strategist Sun Tzu ("Master Sun"), is composed of 13 chapters. Each one is devoted to a different set of skills or art related to warfare and how it applies to military strategy and tactics. For almost 1,500 years it was the lead text in an anthology that was formalized as the Seven Military Classics by Emperor Shenzong of Song in 1080. The Art of War remains the most influential strategy text in East Asian warfare and has influenced both East Asian and Western military theory and thinking and has found a variety applications in a myriad of competitive non-military endeavors across the modern world including espionage,
culture, politics, business, and sports.

The book contains a detailed explanation and analysis of the 5th-century BC Chinese military, from weapons, environmental conditions, and strategy to rank and discipline. Sun also stressed the importance of intelligence operatives and espionage to the war effort. Considered one of history's finest military tacticians and analysts, his teachings and strategies formed the basis of advanced military training for millennia to come.

The book was translated into French and published in 1772 (re-published in 1782) by the French Jesuit Jean Joseph Marie Amiot. A partial translation into English was attempted by British officer Everard Ferguson Calthrop in 1905 under the title The Book of War. The first annotated English translation was completed and published by Lionel Giles in 1910. Military and political leaders such as the Chinese communist revolutionary Mao Zedong, Japanese  Takeda Shingen, Vietnamese general Võ Nguyên Giáp, and American military generals Douglas MacArthur and Norman Schwarzkopf Jr. are all cited as having drawn inspiration from the book.

History

Text and commentaries
The Art of War is traditionally attributed to an ancient Chinese military general known as Sun Tzu (now Romanized "Sunzi") meaning "Master Sun". Sun Tzu was traditionally said to have lived in the 6th century BC, but The Art of War earliest parts probably date to at least 100 years later.

Sima Qian's Records of the Grand Historian, the first of China's 24 dynastic histories, records an early Chinese tradition that a text on military matters was written by one "Sun Wu" from the State of Qi, and that this text had been read and studied by King Helü of Wu. This text was traditionally identified with the received Master Sun's Art of War. The conventional view was that Sun Wu was a military theorist from the end of the Spring and Autumn period (776–471 BC) who fled his home state of Qi to the southeastern kingdom of Wu, where he is said to have impressed the king with his ability to quickly train even court women in military discipline and to have made Wu's armies powerful enough to challenge their western rivals in the state of Chu. This view is still widely held in China.

The strategist, poet, and warlord Cao Cao in the early 3rd century AD authored the earliest known commentary to the Art of War. Cao's preface makes clear that he edited the text and removed certain passages, but the extent of his changes were unclear historically. The Art of War appears throughout the bibliographical catalogs of the Chinese dynastic histories, but listings of its divisions and size varied widely.

Authorship
Beginning around the 12th century, some Chinese scholars began to doubt the historical existence of Sun Tzu, primarily on the grounds that he is not mentioned in the historical classic The Commentary of Zuo (Zuo Zhuan), which mentions most of the notable figures from the Spring and Autumn period. The name "Sun Wu" does not appear in any text prior to the Records of the Grand Historian, and has been suspected to be a made-up descriptive cognomen meaning "the fugitive warrior", glossing the surname "Sun" as the related term "fugitive", while "Wu" is the ancient Chinese virtue of "martial, valiant", which corresponds to Sunzi's role as the hero's doppelgänger in the story of Wu Zixu. In the early 20th century, the Chinese writer and reformer Liang Qichao theorized that the text was actually written in the 4th century BC by Sun Tzu's purported descendant Sun Bin, as a number of historical sources mention a military treatise he wrote. Unlike Sun Wu, Sun Bin appears to have been an actual person who was a genuine authority on military matters, and may have been the inspiration for the creation of the historical figure "Sun Tzu" through a form of euhemerism.

In 1972, the Yinqueshan Han slips were discovered in two Han dynasty (206 BC – 220 AD) tombs near the city of Linyi in Shandong Province. Among the many bamboo slip writings contained in the tombs, which had been sealed between 134 and 118  BC, respectively were two separate texts, one attributed to "Sun Tzu", corresponding to the received text, and another attributed to Sun Bin, which explains and expands upon the earlier The Art of War by Sunzi. The Sun Bin text's material overlaps with much of the "Sun Tzu" text, and the two may be "a single, continuously developing intellectual tradition united under the Sun name". This discovery showed that much of the historical confusion was due to the fact that there were two texts that could have been referred to as "Master Sun's Art of War", not one. The content of the earlier text is about one-third of the chapters of the modern The Art of War, and their text matches very closely. It is now generally accepted that the earlier The Art of War was completed sometime between 500 and 430 BC.

The 13 chapters
The Art of War is divided into 13 chapters (or ); the collection is referred to as being one  ("whole" or alternatively "chronicle").

Cultural influence

Military and intelligence applications 
Across East Asia, The Art of War was part of the syllabus for potential candidates of military service examinations.

During the Sengoku period, the Japanese  Takeda Shingen (1521–1573) is said to have become almost invincible in all battles without relying on guns, because he studied The Art of War. The book even gave him the inspiration for his famous battle standard  (Wind, Forest, Fire and Mountain), meaning fast as the wind, silent as a forest, ferocious as fire and immovable as a mountain.

The translator Samuel B. Griffith offers a chapter on "Sun Tzu and Mao Tse-Tung" where The Art of War is cited as influencing Mao's On Guerrilla Warfare, On the Protracted War and Strategic Problems of China's Revolutionary War, and includes Mao's quote: "We must not belittle the saying in the book of Sun Wu Tzu, the great military expert of ancient China, 'Know your enemy and know yourself and you can fight a thousand battles without disaster.'"

During the Vietnam War, some Viet Cong officers extensively studied The Art of War and reportedly could recite entire passages from memory. General Võ Nguyên Giáp successfully implemented tactics described in The Art of War during the Battle of Dien Bien Phu ending major French involvement in Indochina and leading to the accords which partitioned Vietnam into North and South. General Giáp, later the main PVA military commander in the Vietnam War, was an avid student and practitioner of Sun Tzu's ideas.

Outside East Asia 
The United States' defeat in the Vietnam War, more than any other event, brought Sun Tzu to the attention of leaders of U.S. military theory. The Department of the Army in the United States, through its Command and General Staff College, lists The Art of War as one example of a book that may be kept at a military unit's library. The Art of War is listed on the US Marine Corps Professional Reading Program (formerly known as the Commandant's Reading List). It is recommended reading for all United States Military Intelligence personnel. The Art of War is also used as instructional material at the US Military Academy at West Point, in the course Military Strategy (470), and it is also recommended reading for Officer cadets at the Royal Military Academy, Sandhurst. Some notable military leaders have stated the following about Sun Tzu and The Art of War:

According to some authors, the strategy of deception from The Art of War was studied and widely used by the KGB: "I will force the enemy to take our strength for weakness, and our weakness for strength, and thus will turn his strength into weakness".

Finnish Field Marshal Mannerheim and general Aksel Airo were avid readers of Art of War; Airo kept the book on his bedside table in his quarters.

Application outside the military
The Art of War has been applied to many fields outside of the military. Much of the text is about how to outsmart one's opponent without actually having to engage in physical battle. As such, it has found application as a training guide for many competitive endeavors that do not involve actual combat.

The Art of War is mentioned as an influence in the earliest known Chinese collection of stories about fraud (mostly in the realm of commerce), Zhang Yingyu's The Book of Swindles, which dates to the late Ming dynasty.

Many business books have applied the lessons taken from the book to office politics and corporate business strategy. Many Japanese companies make the book required reading for their key executives. The book is also popular among Western business circles citing its utilitarian values regarding management practices. Many entrepreneurs and corporate executives have turned to it for inspiration and advice on how to succeed in competitive business situations. The book has also been applied to the field of education.

The Art of War has been the subject of legal books and legal articles on the trial process, including negotiation tactics and trial strategy.

The book The 48 Laws of Power by Robert Greene employs philosophies covered in The Art of War.

The Art of War has also been applied in sports. National Football League coach Bill Belichick, record holder of the most Super Bowl wins in history, has stated on multiple occasions his admiration for The Art of War. Brazilian association football coach Luiz Felipe Scolari actively used The Art of War for Brazil's successful 2002 World Cup campaign. During the tournament Scolari put passages of The Art of War underneath his players' doors at night.

The Art of War is often quoted while developing tactics and/or strategy in esports. "Play To Win" by David Sirlin analyses applications of the ideas from The Art of War in modern esports. The Art of War was released in 2014 as an e-book companion alongside the Art of War DLC for Europa Universalis IV, a PC strategy game by Paradox Development Studios, with a foreword by Thomas Johansson.

The Art of War has also been featured in the 2019 video game Age of Empires II: Definitive Edition from Microsoft.

Film and television
The Art of War and Sun Tzu have been referenced and quoted in many movies and television shows, including In the 1987 movie Wall Street, Gordon Gekko (Michael Douglas) frequently references it  The 20th James Bond film, Die Another Day (2002) also references The Art of War as the spiritual guide shared by Colonel Moon and his father. and in The Sopranos. In season 3, episode 8 ("He Is Risen"), Dr. Melfi suggests to Tony Soprano that he read the book. and 
the Star Trek: The Next Generation first-season episode "The Last Outpost", William Riker quotes The Art of War to Captain Picard, who expressed pleasure that Sun Tzu was still taught at Starfleet Academy. Later in the episode, a survivor from a long-dead nonhuman empire noted common aspects between his own people's wisdom and The Art of War with regard to knowing when and when not to fight.

The Art of War is a 2000 action spy film directed by Christian Duguay and starring Wesley Snipes, Michael Biehn, Anne Archer and Donald Sutherland.

Notable translations

 
  Part of the UNESCO Collection of Representative Works.

See also

Books 
 Achtung – Panzer! by Heinz Guderian
 Arthashastra
 Bansenshukai
 Commentarii de Bello Gallico (Commentaries on the Gallic War) by Julius Caesar
 Dream Pool Essays by Shen Kuo
 Epitoma rei militaris by Publius Flavius Vegetius Renatus
 Guerrilla Warfare by Che Guevara
 Hagakure by Yamamoto Tsunetomo
 History of the Peloponnesian War by Thucydides
 Huolongjing by Liu Bowen
 Infanterie Greift An by Erwin Rommel
 On Protracted War by Mao Zedong
 On War by Carl von Clausewitz
 Records of the Grand Historian
 Seven Military Classics
 Seven Pillars of Wisdom by T. E. Lawrence
 The 33 Strategies of War
 The Art of War by Niccolò Machiavelli
 The Book of Five Rings (Miyamoto Musashi)
 The Influence of Sea Power upon History by Alfred Thayer Mahan
 The Jewish War by Josephus
 The Science of Military Strategy
 The Strategikon by Emperor Maurice
 The Utility of Force by Rupert Smith
 Thirty-Six Stratagems

Concepts
 Military treatise
 Philosophy of war

References

Citations

Sources

External links 

 
 The Art of War Chinese-English bilingual edition, Chinese Text Project
  translated by Lionel Giles (1910)
  translated (with Chinese text) by Lionel Giles (1910)
  translated by E.F. Calthrop (1908)
  (English and Chinese original available)
 Sun Tzu's Art of War at Sonshi
 Sun Tzu and Information Warfare at the Institute for National Strategic Studies of National Defense University
 11 The Nine Situations | The Art of War by Sun Tzu (Animated)
 The Art of War illustrated version, on Theoriq.com

Sun Tzu
5th-century BC books
Military history of East Asia
Military strategy books
Seven Military Classics
Warrior code
Works about the theory of history
Zhou dynasty texts